Torii Kiyonobu II ( Nidaime Torii Kiyonobu; active 1725–1760) was a Japanese ukiyo-e artist.  He headed the Torii artistic school from possibly as early as 1725, when its founder Torii Kiyonobu I retired.  Kiyonobu II was a prolific designer of actor prints, principally in the narrow hosoban format, of which he produced at least 300 examples for about 20 different publishers.  He and Torii Kiyomasu II were the main Torii artists of their time and have been rumoured to be the same person.  Kiyonobu II's last known work is an actor print dated to 1760.

References

Works cited

External links

Ukiyo-e Prints by Torii Kiyonobu II

18th-century Japanese artists
Torii school
Ukiyo-e artists